"Unsent" is a song by Canadian singer-songwriter Alanis Morissette from her fourth studio album, Supposed Former Infatuation Junkie (1998). The lyrics were written by Morissette, who also composed the music with Glen Ballard. It was released as the album's third single on March 18, 1999. It was one of the few Junkie tracks on which she played her harmonica. Morissette directed the music video for the song. Without a chorus or hook, "Unsent" has an unconventional song structure. The lyrics consist of letters addressed to Morissette's former boyfriends and friends. The single became a moderate hit, reaching number nine in Canada, number 28 in New Zealand, and number 58 in the United States.

Background
While introducing the song on VH1's Storytellers special in 1999, Alanis Morissette said:

A demo version of the song included lyrics about Morissette's former touring drummer, Taylor Hawkins.

Music video
Alanis Morissette directed the song's music video. Its format reminds of a movie, with subtitles portraying everything that the characters are saying. It opens with "Matthew" playing the guitar to Morissette, who feels she's bothering him and says she should leave. He says she should, but in a kind way. Alanis looks happy, but uncomfortable and leaves. The second act shows Morissette, with curly hair, sitting with "Jonathan" at a bar, asking if she could come to wherever he is going the next day. She's concerned girls are coming on the trip too. He says she can, but doesn't look too interested.

The third act shows Alanis and "Terrance" (played by Josh Hopkins) by the lake, having a conversation about whether he is coming to visit her, to which he jokingly responds that he's "too busy". They laugh and look happy. "Marcus" is the fourth to be shown. They kiss on a sofa, and he says he is very proud of Alanis. "What for?" she replies, and he says "[to be] open to testing different waters at the same time". Morissette looks confused, awkward, and sad. The last scene shows Morissette entering a car driven by "Lou". They say "hi" to one another, but the only other dialogue is when Lou says "What are you thinking?" at the very end of the video.

A 10-minute movie of the video is available with no music and no subtitles, but the actors speak this time. It shows extended footage of all five stories.

Track listing
Canadian and Australian CD single
 "Unsent" (album version) – 4:08
 "Are You Still Mad" (BBC/Radio One live) – 3:59
 "London" (Bridge School Benefit live) – 4:46

Charts

Weekly charts

Year-end charts

References

1999 singles
1998 songs
Alanis Morissette songs
Maverick Records singles
Reprise Records singles
Song recordings produced by Glen Ballard
Songs written by Alanis Morissette
Songs written by Glen Ballard